Jason Andrew Pierce (born 19 November 1965 in Rugby) is an English musician. Currently the frontman and sole permanent member of the band Spiritualized, he previously co-fronted the alternative rock band Spacemen 3 with Peter Kember from 1982 until 1991. He has worked under the name J. Spaceman.

Music 
In between his work with Spiritualized and Spacemen 3, Pierce has been active with a network of free jazz players and improvisers, collaborating with acclaimed artists, including Black Rebel Motorcycle Club, Dr. John, Primal Scream, Daniel Johnston and Yoko Ono.

In 2006, Pierce released his first solo album, Guitar Loops, a limited release on Coxon and Wales's Treader record label. Also in 2006, he composed the original score for an art installation called "Silent Sound" by British artists Iain Forsyth and Jane Pollard. The live performance at St. George's Hall in Liverpool was recorded and released as a limited edition signed and numbered CD. A second performance of Silent Sound took place in 2010 as part of the AV Festival, at Middlesbrough Town Hall. A second limited edition, a signed and numbered CD, was released.

Between 6 and 8 February 2007, Pierce performed in a series of benefit concerts for the HOPING Foundation for Palestinian children.

He provided some of the soundtrack for Harmony Korine's 2007 film Mister Lonely.

In July 2008, Pierce sat down for an interview with NPR before a concert at the 9:30 Club in Washington, D.C. Both the interview and the concert can be heard on the NPR website.

He released a collaboration with Matthew Shipp entitled Spaceshipp on the Treader label in 2008.

Pierce has worked on various solo projects, including the remixing of singles by LFO, Global Communication, and the 22-20's.

His song "Lay It Down Slow" was used for the finale of the hit US drama series Prison Break.

In 2015, he played guitar on the Ariel Pink song "Dayzed Inn Daydreams".

Personal life 
Jason lives with his partner and two children in the East End of London.

In the 1990s, Pierce was in a relationship with Kate Radley, who was also a member of Spiritualized. In 1995, Radley married Richard Ashcroft, lead singer of the Verve.

Pierce was seriously ill with pneumonia in 2005. Both his lungs had filled with liquid; the 5′ 11″ (180 cm) musician's weight plunged to seven stone (44.5 kg; 98 lbs), and his heart stopped beating twice.

In an early 2012 interview, Pierce mentioned he had been under chemotherapy during the recordings of the 2012 Spiritualized album, Sweet Heart Sweet Light. He does not specify the diagnosis for this treatment, but he jokes about it, saying that these are drugs he does not recommend to anybody.

References

1965 births
Living people
English songwriters
English male singers
English rock guitarists
English male guitarists
People from Rugby, Warwickshire
People educated at Lawrence Sheriff School
Spiritualized members
Space rock musicians
Spacemen 3 members
British male songwriters